Trevanger is a hamlet west of St Minver, Cornwall, England, United Kingdom.

References

Hamlets in Cornwall